Ilisia is a genus of crane fly in the family Limoniidae.

Distribution
Palaearctic, North America & Oriental.

Species

I. armillaris (Osten Sacken, 1869)
I. asymmetrica (Alexander, 1913)
I. graphica (Osten Sacken, 1860)
I. incongruens (Alexander, 1913)
I. indianensis (Alexander, 1922)
I. inermis Mendl, 1979
I. maculata (Meigen, 1804)
I. occoecata Edwards, 1936
I. parchomenkoi Savchenko, 1974
I. tenuisentis (Alexander, 1930)
I. venusta (Osten Sacken, 1860)

References

Limoniidae
Nematocera genera
Diptera of Asia
Diptera of Europe
Diptera of North America
Taxa named by Camillo Rondani
Articles containing video clips